Voltaire Township is one of the thirteen townships of Sherman County, Kansas, United States.  The population was 252 at the 2000 census.

Geography
Located in the northern part of the county, it borders the following townships:
Wano Township, Cheyenne County — north
Bird City Township, Cheyenne County — northeast
Shermanville Township — east
Washington Township — southeast
Itasca Township — south, east of Logan Township
Logan Township — south, west of Itasca Township
Lincoln Township — southwestern corner
Grant Township — west
The largest township in Sherman County, it lies north of the county seat of Goodland.  While part of Goodland lies within the township's original boundaries, the city is not part of the township.  There are no communities in the township proper.

Some intermittent headwaters of Beaver Creek, a tributary of the Republican River, flow through Voltaire Township.

Transportation
K-27, a north–south highway, is the only significant road in Voltaire Township.  Goodland Municipal Airport, a general aviation field, lies in the southern part of the township, near Goodland.

Government
As an active township, Voltaire Township is governed by a three-member board, composed of the township trustee, the township treasurer, and the township clerk.  The trustee acts as the township executive.

References

External links
County website

Townships in Sherman County, Kansas
Townships in Kansas